The grey-headed cuckooshrike (Edolisoma schisticeps), also known as the grey-headed cicadabird or black-tipped cicadabird, is a species of bird in the family Campephagidae.  It is found in New Guinea.  Its natural habitats are subtropical or tropical moist lowland forest and subtropical or tropical mangrove forest.

References

grey-headed cuckooshrike
Birds of New Guinea
grey-headed cuckooshrike
grey-headed cuckooshrike
Taxonomy articles created by Polbot